Bruce Robertson may refer to:
 Bruce Robertson (judge) (born 1944), New Zealand judge
 Bruce Robertson (swimmer) (born 1953), Canadian Olympic Games swimmer
 Bruce Robertson (rugby union) (born 1952), All Blacks New Zealand rugby player
 Bruce Robertson (rower) (born 1962), Canadian rower
 Bruce Robertson, anti-hero of the novel Filth by Irvine Welsh
 Bruce Robertson, creator of the Bookseller/Diagram Prize for Oddest Title of the Year